Duckterath station is a station in the city of Bergisch Gladbach in the German state of North Rhine-Westphalia, on the Sülz Valley Railway. It is served by S-Bahn line S 11, operated at 20-minute intervals.

References

S11 (Rhine-Ruhr S-Bahn)
Rhine-Ruhr S-Bahn stations
Railway stations in Germany opened in 1951
Bergisch Gladbach